Central State Hospital for the Criminally Insane may refer to:

 Dodge Correctional Institution, formerly Central State Hospital for the Insane, in Waupun, Wisconsin, United States
 Middle Tennessee Mental Health Institute, formerly Central State Hospital for the Insane, in Nashville, Tennessee, United States

See also 
 Central State Hospital (disambiguation)